Alejandro Daniel "Alex" Pérez Kaufmann (born July 1, 1993) is a Mexican-American professional basketball player for Konyaspor of the Turkish Basketball Super League. He also represents the senior Mexican national basketball team in international competitions.

Professional career
On June 17, 2016, Pérez signed with the Israeli team Maccabi Haifa for the 2016–17 season.

On July 24, 2017, Pérez signed a one-year deal with the Latvian team VEF Rīga. Pérez helped them to reach the 2018 Latvian League Finals and the 2018 VTB League Quarterfinals. In 55 games played during the 2017–18 season (both in the Latvian League and the VTB League), Pérez averaged 11.8 points, 5.8 assists, 2.7 rebounds and 1.4 steals per game.

On July 4, 2018, Pérez signed with the Turkish team Banvit for the 2018–19 season. He finished the season averaging 14.7 points, 5.6 assists and 2.8 rebounds in the Turkish Basketball Super League, along with 12.8 points, 5.1 assists, 3.4 rebounds and league-high 1.9 steals in the Basketball Champions League.

On July 9, 2019, Pérez signed a three-year deal with Lithuanian club Žalgiris Kaunas.

He signed with Bahçeşehir Koleji of the Turkish Basketball Super League on June 26, 2020. In six games, he averaged 8.8 points, 2.7 rebounds, 5.8 assists and 1.0 steal per game.

On November 14, 2020, Perez signed with Fenerbahçe. On June 17, 2021, Pérez officially parted ways with the Turkish club.

On July 4, 2021, he has signed with Türk Telekom of the Turkish Basketball Super League.

On July 21, 2022, he has signed with Konyaspor of the Turkish Basketbol Süper Ligi (BSL).

National team career
Pérez is a member of the Mexico national basketball team, he participated at the 2017 FIBA AmeriCup.

References

External links
RealGM profile
FIBA profile
TBLStat.net Profile

1993 births
Living people
American expatriate basketball people in Argentina
American expatriate basketball people in Israel
American expatriate basketball people in Latvia
American expatriate basketball people in Lithuania
American expatriate basketball people in Turkey
American expatriate basketball people in Venezuela
American men's basketball players
American sportspeople of Mexican descent
Bahçeşehir Koleji S.K. players
Bandırma B.İ.K. players
Basketball players from San Diego
BC Žalgiris players
BK VEF Rīga players
Bucaneros de La Guaira players
Competitors at the 2018 Central American and Caribbean Games
Fenerbahçe men's basketball players
Maccabi Haifa B.C. players
Mexican expatriate basketball people in Argentina
Mexican expatriate basketball people in Latvia
Mexican expatriate sportspeople in Israel
Mexican expatriate sportspeople in Turkey
Mexican men's basketball players
Point guards
San Lorenzo de Almagro (basketball) players
Soles de Mexicali players
Türk Telekom B.K. players